Magnificent Obsession is a 1935 drama film based on the 1929 novel of the same name by Lloyd C. Douglas. The film was adapted by Sarah Y. Mason, Victor Heerman, and George O'Neil, directed by John M. Stahl, and stars Irene Dunne, Robert Taylor, Charles Butterworth, and Betty Furness.

Plot summary
The life of spoiled Robert Merrick (Robert Taylor) is saved through the use of a hospital's only pulmotor, but because the medical device cannot be in two places at once, it results in the death of Dr. Hudson, a selfless, brilliant surgeon and generous philanthropist. Merrick falls in love with Hudson's widow, Helen (Irene Dunne), though she holds him responsible for her husband's demise. One day, he insists on driving her home, and makes a pass at her. She gets out, and is struck by another car, losing her sight. Merrick confronts a friend of Helen's husband, wanting to know why a beautiful young woman would marry a middle-aged man. The doctor's friend tells him that her husband had a philosophy - to help people, but never let it be known that you are the one helping them. Only then, he believed, could there be true reward in life.

Merrick watches over Helen, and visits her during her recuperation, concealing his identity and calling himself Dr. Robert. His true identity is known to Helen's step-daughter, Joyce (Betty Furness), who keeps it a secret. When he finds out that she is nearly penniless, Merrick secretly pays for specialists to try to restore her vision. Finally, she travels to Switzerland, and is told that her eyesight is gone forever. Robert follows her, confesses his true identity, and proposes marriage. She forgives him and reciprocates his love, but goes away, not wanting to be a burden to him.

Six years later, Robert has become a Nobel Prize-winning brain surgeon. He learns that Helen urgently needs an operation, which he performs. When she awakens, her sight has miraculously returned.

Cast
 Irene Dunne as Helen Hudson
 Robert Taylor as Robert Merrick
 Charles Butterworth as Tommy Masterson
 Betty Furness as Joyce Hudson
 Sara Haden as Mrs. Nancy Ashford
 Ralph Morgan as Randolph
 Henry Armetta as Tony
 Gilbert Emery as Doctor Ramsay
 Arthur Treacher as Horace
 Beryl Mercer as Mrs. Eden
 Alyce Ardell as The French Maid
 Theodore von Eltz as Dr. Preston
 Sidney Bracey as Butler
 Arthur Hoyt as Perry
 Cora Sue Collins as Ruth
 Frank Mayo as John Stone (uncredited)

Production notes
The film, which raised Robert Taylor to stardom, had its New York City premiere at Radio City Music Hall on December 30, 1935, and drew capacity crowds, despite frigid weather.

Remake
The film was remade in 1954 by director Douglas Sirk, with Rock Hudson and Jane Wyman in the leads.

Adaptations in other media
Magnificent Obsession was adapted as a radio play on the April 26, 1937, and November 13, 1944, broadcasts of Lux Radio Theater, the first starring Robert Taylor and Irene Dunne in their original film roles, the second with Claudette Colbert and Don Ameche. It was also adapted on the January 19, 1941, broadcast of The Screen Guild Theater, starring Myrna Loy and Don Ameche, and the February 13, 1949, broadcast of Screen Director's Playhouse, with Irene Dunne and Willard Waterman.

Home Media
A newly restored version of the 1935 film is included in the Criterion Collection double-disc package titled “Magnificent Obsession”, released in January 2009. Available in either blu-ray or DVD, the package includes a digital restoration of the 1954 adaptation and extras relating to Douglas Sirk's version.

References

External links 
 
 
 
 

1935 films
Universal Pictures films
Films based on American novels
American black-and-white films
Films scored by Franz Waxman
Films directed by John M. Stahl
1935 drama films
American drama films
1930s English-language films
1930s American films